Alabama City is a former city and now a neighborhood within the city of Gadsden in Etowah County, Alabama, United States. It was equidistant between Gadsden and Attalla, Alabama, approximately 2 1/2 miles west of downtown Gadsden.

History
Founded by Captain James Madison Elliott, Jr. (1854-1914), it was incorporated by a special act of the state legislature in 1891. William Gardner was appointed the first mayor and the city was divided into 4 wards, represented by aldermen C.A. Clayton, C.F. Norris, R.V. Wilson and Abihu Christopher. At the time, it consisted of about 3,000 acres (roughly 5 square miles) between Little Wills Creek and Black Creek. A post office was established as well, and it had about 50 residents.

Captain Elliott's ambitious vision for his new city was to see both neighboring Gadsden and Attalla merging into Alabama City, with intentions of becoming the major industrial hub of Northeast Alabama.

In 1895, the city landed its first major factory, a cotton mill built by the Dwight Manufacturing Company of Chicopee, Massachusetts. Its second major factory, the Alabama Steel and Wire Company (later Gulf State Steel), was opened in 1902. Railroad lines also ran through the city, including the Southern Railroad, Nashville, Chattanooga and St. Louis Railroad and Louisville and Nashville Railroads. In 1912, a streetcar line was constructed by Elliott's company.

Inspired by Birmingham's 1910 merger that transformed it into a major city, in 1914, an effort to merge Alabama City into its smaller neighbor of Attalla failed. Its failure was due in part to the efforts of Gadsden leaders and also due to Captain Elliott's objections in that he did not want Attalla to "swallow" his city, but for it to "swallow" Attalla. Elliott died that year.

By 1915, a thriving commercial district had grown up around 7th Avenue, which became known as "Little Wall Street". A major fire in 1927 damaged or destroyed many structures along Wall Street and Meighan Avenue. The city hall and post office were among the casualties. Although the city was still growing and began to rebuild, it never would recover fully from the loss, especially as neighboring Gadsden flourished. The Depression would also compound the damage to the city, causing many businesses to close. Alabama City ultimately voted to merge into Gadsden on July 13, 1932.

Demographics

Alabama City (1900-1930)

Alabama City first appeared on the 1900 U.S. Census as an incorporated city. It returned until 1930, before merging into neighboring Gadsden in 1932. It was the 15th largest city in Alabama in 1930.

Historic Demographics
{| class="wikitable"
!CensusYear
!Population &RacialMajority
!StatePlaceRank
!CountyPlaceRank
!White
!Black
|-
|1900
|2,429 (-)
|28th (-)
|2nd (-)
|
|
|-
|1910 
|bgcolor="#FFFFFF"|4,313 ↑
|18th ↑
|2nd X
|bgcolor="#FFFFFF"|4,256 ↑ 98.7%
57 (-) 1.3%
|-
|1920
|bgcolor="#FFFFFF"|5,432 ↑
|16th ↑
|2nd X
|bgcolor="#FFFFFF"|5,190 ↑ 95.5%
242 ↑ 4.5%
|-
|1930
|bgcolor="#FFFFFF"|8,544 ↑
|15th ↑
|2nd X
|bgcolor="#FFFFFF"|8,071 ↑ 94.5%
473 ↑ 5.5%
|-
|}

Alabama City Precinct (1900-1950)

The 29th precinct of Etowah County (1900-1950) also bore the name of Alabama City. Note that both the city and precinct population in 1900 was identical, but the precinct also included areas not within the city limits and reported a larger population figure beginning in 1910. In 1960, the precinct was merged, as part of a larger reorganization of counties, into the census division of Gadsden.

Photo Gallery

References

Notes

References

Cities in Alabama
Cities in Etowah County, Alabama